A delusion is a false fixed belief that is not amenable to change in light of conflicting evidence. As a pathology, it is distinct from a belief based on false or incomplete information, confabulation, dogma, illusion, hallucination, or some other misleading effects of perception, as individuals with those beliefs are able to change or readjust their beliefs upon reviewing the evidence. However:

"The distinction between a delusion and a strongly held idea is sometimes difficult to make and depends in part on the degree of conviction with which the belief is held despite clear or reasonable contradictory evidence regarding its veracity."

Delusions have been found to occur in the context of many pathological states (both general physical and mental) and are of particular diagnostic importance in psychotic disorders including schizophrenia, paraphrenia, manic episodes of bipolar disorder, and psychotic depression.

Types
Delusions are categorized into four different groups:

 Bizarre delusion: Delusions are deemed bizarre if they are clearly implausible and not understandable to same-culture peers and do not derive from ordinary life experiences. An example named by the DSM-5 is a belief that someone replaced all of one's internal organs with someone else's without leaving a scar, depending on the organ in question.
 Non-bizarre delusion: A delusion that, though false, is at least technically possible, e.g., the affected person mistakenly believes that they are under constant police surveillance.
 Mood-congruent delusion: Any delusion with content consistent with either a depressive or manic state, e.g., a depressed person believes that news anchors on television highly disapprove of them, or a person in a manic state might believe they are a powerful deity.
 Mood-neutral delusion: A delusion that does not relate to the patient's emotional state; for example, a belief that an extra limb is growing out of the back of one's head is neutral to either depression or mania.

Themes
In addition to these categories, delusions often manifest according to a consistent theme. Although delusions can have any theme, certain themes are more common. Some of the more common delusion themes are:
 Delusion of control: False belief that another person, group of people, or external force controls one's general thoughts, feelings, impulses, or behaviors.
 Cotard delusion: False belief that one does not exist or that one has died. Some cases also include the belief that one is immortal or that one has lost their internal organs, blood, or other body parts.
 Delusional jealousy: False belief that a spouse or lover is having an affair, with no proof to back up the claim.
 Delusion of guilt or sin (or delusion of self-accusation): Ungrounded feeling of remorse or guilt of delusional intensity.
 Thought broadcasting: False belief that other people can know one's thoughts.
 Delusion of thought insertion: Belief that another thinks through the mind of the person.
 Persecutory delusions: False belief that one is being persecuted. 
 Delusion of reference: False belief that insignificant remarks, events, or objects in one's environment have personal meaning or significance. "Usually the meaning assigned to these events is negative, but the 'messages' can also have a grandiose quality."
 Erotomania: False belief that another person is in love with them.
 Religious delusion: Belief that the affected person is a god or chosen to act as a god.
 Somatic delusion: Delusion whose content pertains to bodily functioning, bodily sensations or physical appearance. Usually the false belief is that the body is somehow diseased, abnormal or changed. A specific example of this delusion is delusional parasitosis: Delusion in which one feels infested with insects, bacteria, mites, spiders, lice, fleas, worms, or other organisms.
 Delusion of poverty: Person strongly believes they are financially incapacitated. Although this type of delusion is less common now, it was particularly widespread in the days preceding state support.

Grandiose delusions
Grandiose delusions or delusions of grandeur are principally a subtype of delusional disorder but could possibly feature as a symptom of schizophrenia and manic episodes of bipolar disorder. Grandiose delusions are characterized by fantastical beliefs that one is famous, omnipotent or otherwise very powerful. The delusions are generally fantastic, often with a supernatural, science-fictional, or religious bent. In colloquial usage, one who overestimates one's own abilities, talents, stature or situation is sometimes said to have "delusions of grandeur". This is generally due to excessive pride, rather than any actual delusions. Grandiose delusions or delusions of grandeur can also be associated with megalomania.

Persecutory delusions

Persecutory delusions are the most common type of delusions and involve the theme of being followed, harassed, cheated, poisoned or drugged, conspired against, spied on, attacked, or otherwise obstructed in the pursuit of goals.
Persecutory delusions are a condition in which the affected person wrongly believes that they are being persecuted. Specifically, they have been defined as containing two central elements: The individual thinks that:
 harm is occurring, or is going to occur
 the persecutors have the intention to cause harm

According to the DSM-IV-TR, persecutory delusions are the most common form of delusions in schizophrenia, where the person believes they are "being tormented, followed, sabotaged, tricked, spied on, or ridiculed". In the DSM-IV-TR, persecutory delusions are the main feature of the persecutory type of delusional disorder. When the focus is to remedy some injustice by legal action, they are sometimes called "querulous paranoia".

Causes

Explaining the causes of delusions continues to be challenging and several theories have been developed. One is the genetic or biological theory, which states that close relatives of people with delusional disorder are at increased risk of delusional traits. Another theory is the dysfunctional cognitive processing, which states that delusions may arise from distorted ways people have of explaining life to themselves. A third theory is called motivated or defensive delusions. This one states that some of those persons who are predisposed might experience the onset of delusional disorder in those moments when coping with life and maintaining high self-esteem becomes a significant challenge. In this case, the person views others as the cause of their personal difficulties in order to preserve a positive self-view.

This condition is more common among people who have poor hearing or sight. Also, ongoing stressors have been associated with a higher possibility of developing delusions. Examples of such stressors are immigration, low socioeconomic status, and even possibly the accumulation of smaller daily struggles.

Specific delusions
The top two factors mainly concerned in the germination of delusions are disorder of brain functioning and background influences of temperament and personality.

Higher levels of dopamine qualify as a symptom of disorders of brain function. That they are needed to sustain certain delusions was examined by a preliminary study on delusional disorder (a psychotic syndrome) instigated to clarify if schizophrenia had a dopamine psychosis. There were positive results - delusions of jealousy and persecution had different levels of dopamine metabolite HVA and homovanillyl alcohol (which may have been genetic). These can be only regarded as tentative results; the study called for future research with a larger population.

It is simplistic to say that a certain measure of dopamine will bring about a specific delusion. Studies show age and gender to be influential and it is most likely that HVA levels change during the life course of some syndromes.

On the influence of personality, it has been said: "Jaspers considered there is a subtle change in personality due to the illness itself; and this creates the condition for the development of the delusional atmosphere in which the delusional intuition arises."

Cultural factors have "a decisive influence in shaping delusions". For example, delusions of guilt and punishment are frequent in a Western, Christian country like Austria, but not in Pakistan, where it is more likely persecution. Similarly, in a series of case studies, delusions of guilt and punishment were found in Austrian patients with Parkinson's being treated with l-dopa, a dopamine agonist.

Pathophysiology
The two-factor model of delusions posits that dysfunction in both belief formation systems and belief evaluation systems are necessary for delusions. Dysfunction in evaluations systems localized to the right lateral prefrontal cortex, regardless of delusion content, is supported by neuroimaging studies and is congruent with its role in conflict monitoring in healthy persons. Abnormal activation and reduced volume is seen in people with delusions, as well as in disorders associated with delusions such as frontotemporal dementia, psychosis and Lewy body dementia. Furthermore, lesions to this region are associated with "jumping to conclusions", damage to this region is associated with post-stroke delusions, and hypometabolism this region associated with caudate strokes presenting with delusions.

The aberrant salience model suggests that delusions are a result of people assigning excessive importance to irrelevant stimuli. In support of this hypothesis, regions normally associated with the salience network demonstrate reduced grey matter in people with delusions, and the neurotransmitter dopamine, which is widely implicated in salience processing, is also widely implicated in psychotic disorders.

Specific regions have been associated with specific types of delusions. The volume of the hippocampus and parahippocampus is related to paranoid delusions in Alzheimer's disease, and has been reported to be abnormal post mortem in one person with delusions. Capgras delusions have been associated with occipito-temporal damage and may be related to failure to elicit normal emotions or memories in response to faces.

Diagnosis

The modern definition and Jaspers' original criteria have been criticised, as counter-examples can be shown for every defining feature.

Studies on psychiatric patients show that delusions vary in intensity and conviction over time, which suggests that certainty and incorrigibility are not necessary components of a delusional belief.

Delusions do not necessarily have to be false or 'incorrect inferences about external reality'. Some religious or spiritual beliefs by their nature may not be falsifiable, and hence cannot be described as false or incorrect, no matter whether the person holding these beliefs was diagnosed as delusional or not.
In other situations the delusion may turn out to be true belief. For example, in delusional jealousy, where a person believes that their partner is being unfaithful (and may even follow them into the bathroom believing them to be seeing their lover even during the briefest of partings), it may actually be true that the partner is having sexual relations with another person. In this case, the delusion does not cease to be a delusion because the content later turns out to be verified as true or the partner actually chose to engage in the behavior of which they were being accused.

In other cases, the belief may be mistakenly assumed to be false by a doctor or psychiatrist assessing it, just because it seems to be unlikely, bizarre or held with excessive conviction. Psychiatrists rarely have the time or resources to check the validity of a person's claims leading to some true beliefs to be erroneously classified as delusional. This is known as the Martha Mitchell effect, after the wife of the attorney general who alleged that illegal activity was taking place in the White House. At the time, her claims were thought to be signs of mental illness, and only after the Watergate scandal broke was she proved right (and hence sane).

Similar factors have led to criticisms of Jaspers' definition of true delusions as being ultimately 'un-understandable'. Critics (such as R. D. Laing) have argued that this leads to the diagnosis of delusions being based on the subjective understanding of a particular psychiatrist, who may not have access to all the information that might make a belief otherwise interpretable. R. D. Laing's hypothesis has been applied to some forms of projective therapy to "fix" a delusional system so that it cannot be altered by the patient. Psychiatric researchers at Yale University, Ohio State University and the Community Mental Health Center of Middle Georgia have used novels and motion picture films as the focus. Texts, plots and cinematography are discussed and the delusions approached tangentially. This use of fiction to decrease the malleability of a delusion was employed in a joint project by science-fiction author Philip Jose Farmer and Yale psychiatrist A. James Giannini. They wrote the novel Red Orc's Rage, which, recursively, deals with delusional adolescents who are treated with a form of projective therapy. In this novel's fictional setting other novels written by Farmer are discussed and the characters are symbolically integrated into the delusions of fictional patients. This particular novel was then applied to real-life clinical settings.

Another difficulty with the diagnosis of delusions is that almost all of these features can be found in "normal" beliefs. Many religious beliefs hold exactly the same features, yet are not universally considered delusional. For instance, if a person was holding a true belief then they will of course persist with it. This can cause the disorder to be misdiagnosed by psychiatrists. These factors have led the psychiatrist Anthony David to note that "there is no acceptable (rather than accepted) definition of a delusion." In practice, psychiatrists tend to diagnose a belief as delusional if it is either patently bizarre, causing significant distress, or excessively pre-occupying the patient, especially if the person is subsequently unswayed in belief by counter-evidence or reasonable arguments.

Joseph Pierre, M.D. states that one factor that helps differentiate delusions from other kinds of beliefs is that anomalous subjective experiences are often used to justify delusional beliefs. While idiosyncratic and self-referential content often make delusions impossible to share with others, Dr. Pierre suggests that it may be more helpful to emphasize the level of conviction, preoccupation, and extension of a belief rather than the content of the belief when considering whether a belief is delusional.

It is important to distinguish true delusions from other symptoms such as anxiety, fear, or paranoia. To diagnose delusions a mental state examination may be used. This test includes appearance, mood, affect, behavior, rate and continuity of speech, evidence of hallucinations or abnormal beliefs, thought content, orientation to time, place and person, attention and concentration, insight and judgment, as well as short-term memory.

Johnson-Laird suggests that delusions may be viewed as the natural consequence of failure to distinguish conceptual relevance. That is, irrelevant information would be framed as disconnected experiences, then it is taken to be relevant in a manner that suggests false causal connections. Furthermore, relevant information would be ignored as counterexamples.

Definition
Although non-specific concepts of madness have been around for several thousand years, the psychiatrist and philosopher Karl Jaspers was the first to define the four main criteria for a belief to be considered delusional in his 1913 book General Psychopathology. These criteria are:
 certainty (held with absolute conviction)
 incorrigibility (not changeable by compelling counterargument or proof to the contrary)
 impossibility or falsity of content (implausible, bizarre, or patently untrue)
not amenable to understanding (i.e., belief cannot be explained psychologically)

Furthermore, when beliefs involve value judgments, only those which cannot be proven true are considered delusions. For example: a man claiming that he flew into the Sun and flew back home. This would be considered a delusion, unless he were speaking figuratively, or if the belief had a cultural or religious source. Only the first three criteria remain cornerstornes of the current definition of a delusion in the DSM-5.

Robert Trivers writes that delusion is a discrepancy in relation to objective reality, but with a firm conviction in reality of delusional ideas, which is manifested in the "affective basis of delusion."

Treatment
Delusions and other positive symptoms of psychosis are often treated with antipsychotic medication, which exert a medium effect size according to meta-analytic evidence. Cognitive behavioral therapy (CBT) improves delusions relative to control conditions according to a meta-analysis. A meta-analysis of 43 studies reported that metacognitive training (MCT) reduces delusions at a medium to large effect size relative to control conditions.

Criticism
Some psychiatrists criticize the practice of defining one and the same belief as normal in one culture and pathological in another culture for cultural essentialism. They argue that it is not justified to assume that culture can be simplified to a few traceable, distinguishable and statistically quantifiable factors and that everything outside those factors must be biological since cultural influences are mixed, including not only parents and teachers but also peers, friends, and media, and the same cultural influence can have different effects depending on earlier cultural influences. Other critical psychiatrists argue that just because a person's belief is unshaken by one influence does not prove that it would remain unshaken by another. For example, a person whose beliefs are not changed by verbal correction from a psychiatrist, which is how delusion is usually diagnosed, may still change his or her mind when observing empirical evidence, only that psychiatrists rarely, if ever, present patients with such situations.

Anthropologist David Graeber have criticized psychiatry's assumption that an absurd belief goes from being delusional to "being there for a reason" merely because it is shared by many people by arguing that just as genetic pathogens like viruses can take advantage of an organism without benefitting said organism, memetic phenomena can spread while being harmful to societies, implying that entire societies can become ill. David Graeber argued that if somatic medicine did not have higher scientific standards than psychiatry's way of defining delusion, pandemics like the plague would have been considered to transsubstantiate from an illness to "a phenomenon that benefits the people" as soon as it had spread to a sufficiently large portion of the population. It was argued by Graeber that since deinstitutionalisation made sales of psychiatric medication profitable by no longer needing to spend money on keeping the patients in mental hospitals, corrupt incentives for psychiatry to allege "needs" for treatments 
have increased (in particular with regard to medicines that are said to be needed in daily doses, not so much regarding devices that can be kept for longer periods of time) which may itself be a harmful memetic pandemic in society that leads to diagnosing and medication of criticisms of widespread beliefs that are actually absurd and harmful, making the absurd belief that is not labelled as an illness profitable anyway by attracting criticisms that are labelled as illnesses.

See also

References 

Cited text

Further reading

External links 

 
Psychosis
Communication of falsehoods
Belief
Deception